SCAA Causeway Bay RFC is a rugby union and sports club based in Hong Kong.

History
SCAA First Pacific Causeway Bay RFC was founded in 1988 as a development side. The club's development has accelerated since then and joined the first division in 2004.

Club teams also compete in other sports including league-topping Junior Netball, the United Mavericks Women's Lacrosse and Mini Lacrosse.

2012-2013 Premiership squad
in bold = players internationals

SCAA CWB Management Committee 
 Umesh Desai - Chairman
 Harvey Gilbert - Vice-Chairman & Membership
 Harvey Gilbert - Finance Manager
 Martin Robinson - Secretary
 Joseph Mayega - Club Captain & Senior Rugby Manager
 Bella Mo /  Martini Ip - Senior Women's Rugby Representatives
 Jimson Lam - Youth Rugby Manager
 Sam Pinder - Netball Manager
 Carol Slawson - Lacrosse Manager
 Valentin Barrié - Sponsorship Manager
 Brian Lam - Kit Manager
 Tom Lane /  Glory Wang - Communications Managers
 Thomas Leung - SCAA Liaison

Past Notable Male Players 
 Sam Pinder - Scottish international, former Glasgow Warriors player
 Jung Ho Jung - Hong Kong international
 Rambo Leung - Hong Kong international
 Mark Loynd - Hong Kong international
 Kelvin Yip - Hong Kong international
 Pierre Antoine "PAM" Montfort - France international
 Thibaut "Poussin" Jullien - France international
 Valentin Barrie - France international
 Matthew McManaway - New Zealand international
 Angus Maclean - Scottish international
 Martin Rainey - Scottish international
 Antoine Nourisson - France international

Trophies and History 
The men section has won the League and Grand Championship in 2013/2014 and 2014/2015.

Participation in french TV reality program "Les Anges de la telerealite" in December 2019, shooting during a game against Typhoons and a one way win for Causeway Bay RFC after multiple devastating scrums.

Past Notable Female Players  
 Chan, Ho Ting Hoty - Hong Kong international
 Lau, Sin Tung Kim - Hong Kong international
 Wong, Jin Ting Henrietta - Hong Kong international

References

External links

Hong Kong rugby union teams